Second-seeded Margaret Osborne defeated first-seeded Pauline Betz 1–6, 8–6, 7–5 in the final to win the women's singles tennis title at the 1946 French Championships.

Seeds
The seeded players are listed below. Margaret Osborne is the champion; others show the round in which they were eliminated.

  Pauline Betz (finalist)
  Margaret Osborne (champion)
  Louise Brough (semifinals)
  Patricia Todd (third round)
  Monique Hamelin (third round)
  Billie Yorke (first round)
  Alice Weiwers (quarterfinals)
  Ginette Jucker (third round)
  Betty Hilton (quarterfinals)
  Micheline Inglebert (third round)
  Doris Hart (quarterfinals)
  Dorothy Bundy (semifinals)
  Nelly Landry (quarterfinals)
  Simone Laffargue (third round)
  Jadwiga Jędrzejowska (third round)
  Helena Straubeová (third round)

Draw

Key
 Q = Qualifier
 WC = Wild card
 LL = Lucky loser
 r = Retired

Finals

Earlier rounds

Section 1

Section 2

Section 3

Section 4

References

External links

1946 in women's tennis
1946
1946 in French women's sport
1946 in French tennis